Falaise Park is a large urban park in East Vancouver, British Columbia, Canada. It is located on Vancouver-Burnaby border, between Rupert Street and Boundary Road, just south of Rupert Station of the Millennium Line. 

Falaise Park consists of two parts, an upper one and a lower one, separated by an elementary school. Both have children's playgrounds. The lower half that borders on Grandview Highway also has sports facilities.

References

Parks in Vancouver